Danielle Crittenden (born April 20, 1963), is a Canadian-American author and journalist.

Career 
Born in Toronto, Ontario, she is the daughter of Max Crittenden, a former editor with the Toronto Telegram, and journalist and book critic Yvonne Crittenden. Her stepfather was journalist Peter Worthington. She graduated in 1981 from Northern Secondary School in Toronto. She did not attend university but became a full-time general assignment reporter and feature writer at the Toronto Sun until 1984. She then traveled and freelanced for magazines and newspapers until marrying David Frum, in 1988. The couple moved to New York and later to Washington, D.C. She is a convert to Judaism.

Works
What Our Mothers Didn't Tell Us: Why Happiness Eludes the Modern Woman, (Simon and Schuster, 1999)
Amanda Bright@Home, (Warner Books 2003)
 The President's Secret IMs, (Simon Spotlight Entertainment 2007), 
 "From a Polish Country House Kitchen" with Anne Applebaum, (Chronicle Books, 2012)

References

External links

1963 births
Canadian women journalists
Living people
Journalists from Toronto
Writers from Toronto
Canadian feminist writers
Canadian women non-fiction writers
Canadian women novelists
Female critics of feminism
HuffPost writers and columnists
Individualist feminists
Converts to Judaism
Jewish Canadian journalists
American women columnists
20th-century Canadian non-fiction writers
21st-century Canadian novelists
20th-century Canadian women writers
21st-century Canadian women writers
21st-century American women